Kim Jong-Kyung (born 9 May 1982) is a South Korean football defender, who currently plays for Indonesian club Batavia United FC.

Club career 

Kim's first step in professional football in Korea was somewhat unusual; his first club was the military club Gwangju Sangmu Bulsajo, while he fulfilled his military obligations. Typically, players defer their military stint until after they have already established, or have attempted to establish, a professional career to which they can return while they complete their duties.

Following the completion of his military service, Kim moved to Gyeongnam FC for 2006, the club making its debut that year in the K League. A regular starter for Gyeongnam, Kim transferred to Jeonbuk Hyundai Motors for the 2007 season, and once again was a regular starter. For 2008, Kim transferred to Daegu FC for two seasons.  However, this was an unsuccessful move, and Kim only played two matches for the club, in the 2008 edition of League Cup

At the conclusion of the 2009 season, Kim moved to Indonesian club Persipura Jayapura, making a start in an AFC Champions League match.  Kim then moved to the capital of Indonesia, Jakarta, playing for Persitara in the Indonesian Super League.  Following the relegation of Persitara to the Liga Indonesia Premier Division, Kim moved to newly established Batavia United FC to ensure he remained in the Indonesian Super League.

References

External links 
 
 

1982 births
Living people
Association football defenders
South Korean footballers
Gimcheon Sangmu FC players
Gyeongnam FC players
Jeonbuk Hyundai Motors players
Daegu FC players
K League 1 players
Expatriate footballers in Indonesia